Sarah Wood is a British businesswoman. She is the co-founder of video advertising platform Unruly and received an OBE for services to innovation and technology.

Early life and education 
Wood was born in Newcastle upon Tyne, England where she lived until the age of ten before moving close to Brighton. Wood graduated from Cambridge University with a bachelor's degree in English and a master's degree in American literature.

Career 
From 2002 to 2004 Wood worked as a fundraising and development officer The Old Vic theatre in London. From 2004 to 2005, she was a lecturer in American Studies at the University of Sussex.

In 2006, Wood co-founded Unruly, a global video advertising marketplace, with Scott Button and Matt Cooker. In 2015 Wood and her co-founders sold Unruly to American media and publishing company News Corp.

In 2018, Wood was appointed a non-executive board member for global lifestyle clothing brand Superdry. additionally, She has served as a judge for the Women's Prize for Fiction. Wood is an independent director on the board of Tech Nation, a growth platform for British tech entrepreneurs.

Wood is also an ambassador for The Prince's Trust "Women Supporting Women" programme, and is on the advisory boards for AccelerateHer and City Ventures (University of London).

In October 2018, Wood released her first publication Stepping Up, about business leadership.

During 2021, Wood was appointed Non Executive Director of Uk-based artificial intelligence company Signal AI. The company uses artificial intelligence to transform data into accessible business knowledge. Additionally in 2021, Wood was also appointed Non Executive Director of International investment firm Hambro Perks, an acquisition firm that provide capital and support to technology-enabled companies.

Recognition 
In 2015, Wood was voted one of "15 Women to Watch in Tech" by Inc., one of Europe's "‘most inspiring women’ in technology" by Inspiring Fifty and #4 in Digital Spy's "Top 10 Women in Tech".

In November 2016 Wood received an OBE in the Queen's 90th Birthday Honours for services to innovation and technology.

Personal life 
She lives in London with her husband Scott Button and her three children.

References 

Living people
21st-century British businesswomen
Businesspeople from Newcastle upon Tyne
Women inventors
Year of birth missing (living people)